Lissi Alandh (1930–2008) was a Swedish film, stage and television actress.

Selected filmography
 Loffe the Tramp (1948)
 The Street (1949)
 Big Lasse of Delsbo (1949)
 The Realm of the Rye (1950)
 Miss Julie (1951)
 In Lilac Time (1952)
 Ursula, the Girl from the Finnish Forests (1953)
 Marianne (1953)
 No Man's Woman (1953)
 A Night in the Archipelago (1953)
 Unmarried Mothers (1953)
Taxi 13 (1954)
 Storm Over Tjurö (1954)
 Enchanted Walk (1954)
 Whoops! (1955)
 The Hard Game (1956)
 Girls Without Rooms (1956)
 Mannequin in Red (1958)
 Loving Couples (1964)
 Night Games (1966)
 The Lustful Vicar (1970)

References

Bibliography
 Steene, Birgitta. Ingmar Bergman: A Reference Guide. Amsterdam University Press, 2005.

External links

1930 births
2008 deaths
People from Sundsvall Municipality
Swedish film actresses
Swedish stage actresses
Swedish television actresses